The Kilmodan Carved Stones are a group of West Highland carved grave slabs exhibited in a burial aisle within Kilmodan Churchyard, Clachan of Glendaruel, within the Cowal Peninsula, Argyll and Bute. They are in the care of Historic Scotland.

Gallery

References

External links

 Historic Environment Scotland - website
 Faith in Cowal - website
 Friends of Kilmodan & Colintraive - website

Archaeological sites in Argyll and Bute
Cowal
Historic Scotland properties in Argyll and Bute
Pictish stones
Glendaruel
Kilmodan